Oscar Jeanfavre (died June 1939) was a Swiss gymnast. He competed in the men's individual all-around event at the 1900 Summer Olympics.

References

External links
 

Year of birth missing
1939 deaths
Swiss male artistic gymnasts
Olympic gymnasts of Switzerland
Gymnasts at the 1900 Summer Olympics
Place of birth missing
Date of death missing